Smoking in Italy has been  banned in  public places including bars, restaurants, discotheques and offices since 2005. A majority of Italians supported the ban at the time it was first implemented, but there was a lack of support from smokers and some bar owners. 5% of bar and restaurant owners immediately introduced separate smoking rooms.

History 
Early anti-smoking legislation was introduced in Italy when on November 11, 1975, law no. 584 was passed, prohibiting smoking on public transport and in some public places such as hospitals, cinemas, theaters, universities, museums, and libraries. In 1986, Health Minister Costante Degan unsuccessfully tried to implement a smoking ban in bars and restaurants, but the push would be neglected amid other concerns. 

After almost two decades, a comprehensive ban of smoking in all public places was finally introduced by Health Minister Girolamo Sirchia on January 16, 2003, making Italy the 4th European country to introduce a smoking ban in all public places. Heart attacks in Italian adults dropped significantly following the implementation of the smoking ban. The decline in heart attacks was attributed to less passive smoking. Health Minister Girolamo Sirchia said that smoking was the leading preventable cause of death in Italy. 
The ban caused an 8% decrease in cigarette consumption. However, rates of law enforcement are not uniform in the country; higher in Northern Italy, Tuscany and Sardinia, much lower in Southern Italy, especially in Calabria (70%) and Campania (76%).

Prevalence

The smoking rate in Italy between 2000 and 2020 is about 23.7%; slightly higher than the United States' 21.8%. Furthermore, data shows a general downward trend in smoking rate between 2000 and 2016. In 2005 when smoking was banned in public places the rate was about 25.6% and fell to the current level of about 23.7% showing that the law did in fact limit and discourage citizens from smoking.

See also 
 Health in Italy

Further reading
 Fumo: Italy's Love Affair with the Cigarette  by Carl Ipsen, 2016, Stanford University Press

References

Politics of Italy
Italy
Health in Italy